Anne-Gaëlle Sidot (born 24 July 1979) is a former professional tennis player from France.

Career
Sidot turned professional in 1994. Her best Grand Slam singles performances were reaching the third round exactly once in each of the four Grand Slam tournaments. She won two WTA Tour doubles titles in Leipzig in 2000 and Nice in 2001, and was the runner-up in Los Angeles and Zürich in 2000. She also reached the quarterfinals of the 1999 Wimbledon women's doubles with Kristie Boogert of the Netherlands.

She represented her country in the Fed Cup in 1997, and retired from the tour in 2002.

WTA career finals

Doubles 4 (2 titles, 2 runner-ups)

ITF Circuit finals

Singles (7–4)

Doubles (3–1)

External links
 
 
 

1979 births
Living people
People from Enghien-les-Bains
French female tennis players
Sportspeople from Val-d'Oise